Croft was a rural district in the North Riding of Yorkshire from 1894 to 1974.

It was created under the Local Government Act 1894 from that part of the Darlington rural sanitary district which was in the North Riding (the rest forming Darlington Rural District in County Durham).  It was named after Croft-on-Tees.

It was abolished under the Local Government Act 1972 in 1974.  The parishes of Girsby and Over Dinsdale went to form part of the new North Yorkshire district of Hambleton, with the rest going to the Richmondshire district.

References
https://web.archive.org/web/20070930225830/http://www.visionofbritain.org.uk/relationships.jsp?u_id=10169410

Districts of England created by the Local Government Act 1894
Districts of England abolished by the Local Government Act 1972
Hambleton District
History of North Yorkshire
Rural districts of the North Riding of Yorkshire